In medicine, "topographical codes" (or "topography codes") are codes that indicate a specific location in the body.

Examples
Only the first of these is a system dedicated only to topography. The others are more generalized systems that contain topographic axes.

 Nomina Anatomica (updated to Terminologia Anatomica)
 ICD-O
 SNOMED
 MeSH (the 'A' axis)

See also
Medical classification

Anatomy